Solute carrier family 25 member 46 is a protein that in humans is encoded by the SLC25A46 gene. This protein is a member of the SLC25 mitochondrial solute carrier family. It is a transmembrane protein located in the mitochondrial outer membrane involved in lipid transfer from the endoplasmic reticulum (ER) to mitochondria. Mutations in this gene result in neuropathy and optic atrophy.

Structure 
The SLC25A46 gene is located on the q arm of chromosome 5 in position 22.1 and spans 27,039 base pairs. The gene produces a 46.2 kDa protein composed of 418 amino acids. This gene has 8 exons and encodes a multi-pass integral membrane protein localized to the mitochondrial outer membrane.

Function 
The encoded protein is an orphan transporter involved in lipid transfer from the endoplasmic reticulum to mitochondria. It promotes mitochondrial fission and prevents the formation of hyperfilamentous mitochondria. This protein forms a complex with mitofilin (IMMT) on the inner mitochondrial membrane, independent of MFN2.

Clinical Significance 
Mutations in the SLC25A46 gene, inherited in an autosomal recessive manner, cause type 6B hereditary motor and sensory neuropathy. Symptoms include early-onset optic atrophy, progressive visual loss, and peripheral sensorimotor neuropathy manifesting as axonal Charcot-Marie-Tooth disease, with variable age at onset and severity.

Overexpression of this protein causes mitochondrial fragmentation while knockdown of this protein causes mitochondrial hyperfusion and hyperfilamentous mitochondria due to decreased mitochondrial fission. Loss of this gene also has many other effects: premature cellular senescence, impaired cellular respiration, destabilization of the MICOS (mitochondrial contact site and cristae organizing system) complex, loss of and shortened cristae, altered ER morphology, impaired cell migration, and changes in mitochondrial phospholipid composition.

Interactions 
This protein interacts with IMMT, a component of the MICOS complex, along with other components of this complex and components of an ER membrane protein complex involved in transferring lipids to mitochondria. Additionally, this protein interacts with SLC7A8, SLC10A1, SLC10A6, FHL3, FUNDC1, linc01142, LEPROTL1, ODF4, VMA21, MFSD14B, PQLC1, HSD17B11, REEP2, REEP4, and TOMM22. This protein possibly interacts with OPA1 and MFN2.

References

Further reading 

 
 
 
 
 
 
 

Solute carrier family